Tillandsia matudae is a species of flowering plant in the genus Tillandsia. This species is native to Oaxaca, Chiapas and Guatemala.

References

matudae
Flora of Guatemala
Flora of Mexico
Plants described in 1949
Taxa named by Lyman Bradford Smith